Amy Kathleen Sloan is a Canadian-American actress. She was born in Gladstone, Manitoba, raised in Whitehorse, Yukon and graduated from the National Theatre School of Canada.

Filmography

Film

Television

Stage
All My Sons - Ann Deever Geffen Playhouse
How the Light Gets In - Grace Wheeler. Boston Court

References

External links

Canadian film actresses
Canadian stage actresses
Canadian television actresses
Living people
People from Whitehorse
Actresses from Yukon
Actresses from Manitoba
21st-century Canadian actresses
Year of birth missing (living people)